Paul Lewis Anderson (1880–1956) was an American photographer and author who wrote five young adult historical fiction novels focusing on ancient Rome and two young adult novels about life in a New England boys' prep school. He also wrote numerous outdoors-oriented short stories for magazines such as Boys' Life and The Outdoorsman.

Life and work
Anderson was born in Trenton, New Jersey.  He attended Lehigh University, where he was a member of the gymnastics team, specializing in the flying rings. He graduated in 1901 and worked in electrical engineering before taking up photography in 1907.    He was influenced by the photographs in the magazine Camera Work.  In 1910 he started working as a professional photographer. A self-taught and award-winning photographer, Anderson worked within the mainstream pictorialist aesthetic of his day.  Yet at the same time, drawing upon his engineering background, he applied a methodical and experimental approach within his creative process in order to advance his artistic ideals. Anderson was close friends with Karl Struss, whose positive meniscus Struss Pictorial Lens he favored.

In 1910, Anderson married Mary Lyon Green, with whom he had two daughters, born in 1912 and 1916.

Prior to World War I, he operated portrait studios in New York City and East Orange, New Jersey.   In 1916 and 1917, he taught at the Clarence H. White School of Photography, founded by Clarence Hudson White, 1914–1918, and published several books and articles on photography.  He set aside his writing on photography in 1925 and started instead to write fiction, beginning with short stories and two novels about student life at a boys' prep school in the fictional New England town of Lockport; he later followed with the five novels of his Roman Life and Times series, which have never been out of print since their initial publication. He returned to writing on photography some eight years later, at the same time continuing his fiction-writing career, which came to a close in 1939 with the publication of Pugnax the Gladiator.

According to family lore as related by his elder daughter, Anderson was good friends with Edward Weston. The two disagreed vehemently on photographic style with regard to the artistic value of sharp focus (Weston's preference) versus soft focus (Anderson's style). Anderson put an end to the disagreement by producing a wire-sharp picture of a dead mackerel on a plate.

Some of his photography is displayed at the Cleveland Museum of Art.

Selected bibliography

Photography books

Novels
 
A spoiled and wild young man arrives as a new student at a fine New England boys' prep school, gets into trouble, and is put in the charge of one of the older students for a summer of re-education. (Out of print.)
 
A hardworking but financially disadvantaged young man achieves his goal of admission to a fine New England boys' prep school, works hard but is beset by misfortunes and difficulties. (Out of print.)
 
The conquest of Gaul and the figures of Caesar and his generals as well as aspects of the Roman army are presented in a personal way through the eyes of a young legionary soldier.
 
 A young slave is confronted by the conspiracy of his master Catiline.
 
A stirring novel of Vercingertorix, defender of the Gauls against Caesar’s invasion. From the view point of a young Gaul with Roman associations.
 
Gaius, a young Roman aristocrat in Caesar’s Tenth Legion, takes part in the invasion of Britain, is captured, and designated for sacrifice by the Druids; only a British princess can save him.
 
Dumnorix the Aeduan, sold into slavery and given the Roman name of Pugnax ("Fond of Fighting"), becomes a gladiator at Rome and encounters undreamed of adventures

References

External links

 
 

American historical novelists
20th-century American photographers
1880 births
1956 deaths
20th-century American novelists
20th-century American male writers
American male novelists